MV Kungsholm was built in 1966 by the John Brown & Company shipyard in Clydebank, Scotland as a combined ocean liner / cruise ship for the Swedish American Line. She was later rebuilt as a full-time cruise ship sailing under the names MV Sea Princess, MV Victoria, MV Oceanic II. and MV Mona Lisa. In September 2010 she was retired from service as she did not fulfill requirements to SOLAS 2010, becoming the floating hotel Veronica, before being scrapped in 2016.

Design & Construction
The Kungsholm was designed by the longtime Swedish American Line technical director Eric Christiansson, who had designed all Swedish American Line new-builds since 1938, and introduced the trademark double stack, streamline profile to the majority of the new ships.
John Brown & Company, Clydebank, Scotland was selected to construct the new Kungsholm, and she was launched in 1965. She was fitted with two Swedish built Götaverken nine cylinder engines have a combined output of 25,200 SHP, which gave her a service speed of 21 knots, although she achieved 25 knots during her sea trials. The ship was equipped with Denny Brown stabilizers and was one of the handful of British built liners to have a bulbous bow. The vessel met all updated SOLAS requirements as of the 1992 modifications.

The ship's original Gross Registered Tonnage was 26,678. After rebuilding for service with P&O, her tonnage was increased to 27,670. Later she was measured at 28,891 GT. She is 201 meters (660 ft) long with a breadth of 26.5 meters.

The ship's passenger capacity was 713 as a transatlantic liner, but only 450 as a cruise ship before the addition of extra cabins increased the number of berths to 730. She carries 417 crew members. The maximum capacity utilizing upper (passenger) and lower (crew) berths is 994 persons.

History

Kungsholm - Swedish American Line 
As Kungsholm, the ship first entered service for the Swedish America Line in 1966 as a transatlantic ocean liner, the last liner built for the Gothenburg – New York City run. Although built for transatlantic service, she was also designed to spend a large proportion of the year cruising.

Kungsholm - Flagship Cruises 
In 1975, the Swedish America Line closed its passenger services and Kungsholm was sold to Flagship Cruises, who retained her name and used her for cruising from the United States. She was re-registered in Liberia.

Sea Princess - P&O Princess Cruises

Rebuilding 
In 1978 she was purchased by P&O and was sent to Vegesack for rebuilding by Bremer Vulkan. She had her appearance dramatically altered by the removal of the forward (dummy) funnel, reshaping of her remaining funnel, and the addition of extra cabins. Under UK registry her tonnage had increased to 27,670 and she had accommodation for 750 passengers.

She was renamed Sea Princess and was initially based in Australia. From 1981 Sea Princess alternated between deployments with P&O's UK fleet and the subsidiary Princess Cruises fleet. Multiple episodes of The Love Boat were filmed on board when deployed in Australia. As her deployments changed, so did the colour of her funnel; buff (yellow) for P&O, white with the Sea Witch logo for Princess Cruises.

Victoria - P&O Cruises 
In 1995 she was renamed Victoria and for the rest of her career with P&O Cruises operated out of Southampton. The name change was to allow the then new addition to the Princess Cruises fleet to be named Sea Princess.

In 1999/2000 Victoria was chartered for the Union-Castle Line centenary voyage and had her funnel repainted in that company's livery.

Mona Lisa - Holiday Kreuzfahrten 

In 2002 she was sold by P&O and sailed for Holiday Kreuzfahrten as Mona Lisa until 2006, bearing a large image of the painting of the same name on her funnel. On 12 May 2004, during a heavy foggy day, the Mona Lisa got stuck in the San Marco basin in Venice, in front of St Mark's square. Holiday Kreuzfahrten was declared bankrupt in September 2006. Following the bankruptcy of Holiday Kreuzfahrten, Mona Lisa was briefly laid up at Pireus, Greece, but in November 2006 she was chartered for use as a hotel ship in Doha, Qatar for the duration of the Asian Games. The charter to Qatar ended on 1 January 2007.

Oceanic II 
In 2007, the ship was chartered by Royal Caribbean Cruises Ltd. (RCCL) and was renamed Oceanic II. From 30 April to 28 May 2007, Louis Hellenic Cruises sub-chartered the ship as a temporary replacement for the MV Sea Diamond, which went aground off the coast of Santorini, Greece and sank earlier in April. Following this she was operated by Pullmantur Cruises (a subsidiary of RCCL) for the 2007 northern hemisphere summer season.

The Scholar Ship 
The ship was refitted to become an educational vessel for The Scholar Ship international education program, a cooperative venture between seven major world universities and RCCL. The Scholar Ship offered undergraduate and graduate semester programs during four-month voyages. The inaugural voyage embarked in September 2007, with a second voyage in early 2008. In June 2008 the discontinuation of the program was announced.

Mona Lisa - Lord Nelson Seereisen 

Oceanic II reverted to the name Mona Lisa prior to her charter to German tour operator Lord Nelson Seereisen, which ran from 28 April to 31 August 2008. On 4 May 2008 Mona Lisa was grounded in the Irbe Strait while leaving Riga. She suffered no major damage, but the passengers were evacuated from the ship on 5 May after unsuccessful efforts to free the ship from the sand bank. Mona Lisa was eventually pulled free from the sandbank on 7 May 2008. She subsequently sailed to a drydock in Ventspils, Latvia for inspection and returned to normal cruise traffic on 8 May 2008.

Peace Boat 
Following the completion of her charter to Lord Nelson Seereisen, Mona Lisa was chartered to Peace Boat for the duration of the 2008/2009 northern hemisphere winter season. For the duration of the 2009 northern hemisphere summer season she again returned to the fleet of Lord Nelson Seereisen.

Vancouver Winter Olympics 
From 26 January to 23 March 2010, Mona Lisa was used as floating accommodations while docked at the Squamish port in British Columbia, Canada. During the 2010 Winter Olympics and Paralympics in Vancouver and Whistler, approximately 1,400 crew, volunteers and paid staff were housed aboard.

Final Sailing Years 
She resumed her voyages with Lord Nelson Seereisen during 2010 from May until August.  Her future after termination of her charter to Lord Nelson Seereisen in August 2010 was uncertain as she did not comply with the new SOLAS regulations coming into effect in October 2010.

Retirement

Potential return to Sweden 
A letter of intent was signed between the ship's owners and Swedish entrepreneur Lars Hallgren for the acquisition of the ship in 2010. Hallgren planned to use the ship as a floating hotel in Gothenburg. Should his plans have been realized, certain features of the Kungsholms original appearance, such as her two funnels, would have been restored. Mr. Hallgren withdrew his offer to purchase Mona Lisa because the City of Gothenburg would only lease dock space for the ship to be berthed in Gothenburg for five years,
and scrap buyers inspected her in the following weeks. However, the city of Stockholm expressed a sudden interest in letting Lars Hallgren berth and preserve Mona Lisa there, first for use as a student accommodation ship and then for use a permanently berthed hotel and museum. These plans unfortunately fell through. The ship was instead purchased by a company in Oman to become a floating hotel.

Veronica - Floating Hotel 
After the failed attempt to return the ship to Sweden, she was bought by the Korean Daewoo company and moved to Duqm, Oman.Mona Lisa made her way from Germany to Piraeus, in September, 2010. Mona Lisa left Piraeus on October 11, bound for the Suez Canal and for use as an accommodation ship in Oman. She then arrived to Oman on October 26, 2010 where she was renamed Veronica, and spent the next three years until October 2013, as a luxury Floating Hotel in the wilayat of Duqm. She was then laid up for two years until sold to ship breakers in Alang, India in late 2015.

Scrapping 
In November 2015 it was reported that although it was still hoped to take her back to Sweden as a hotel ship she had in fact been sold for scrap and was being towed by the tug Kamarina to the ship breaking yard of Alang. She arrived at Alang in November, after waiting for a high tide and permission to run aground, was scrapped in May 2016.

References

External links 

Swedish American Line History
Film: Sea Princess Tour 1979
Ship Spotting - Kungsholm - Sea Princess - Victoria 
Veronica Duqm floating hotel to spur tourism

1965 ships
Ships built on the River Clyde
Ocean liners
Ships of P&O Cruises
Ships of Princess Cruises
Ships of Swedish American Line